The Anglican Diocese of Ukwa is one of nine within the Anglican Province of Aba, itself one of 14 provinces within the Church of Nigeria. The inaugural bishop was Uju Obinya and the current bishop is Samuel Kelechi Eze

Notes

Church of Nigeria dioceses
Dioceses of the Province of Aba